Wendy Moten (born November 22, 1964) is an American jazz singer from Tennessee. Born in Memphis and based in Nashville, Moten has had a successful career in music, including several major-label solo records, some international hit songs, and a second career as a touring musician. At age 56, she entered an American national talent competition, The Voice, where she finished as the runner-up. Moten is best known for the single "Come In Out of the Rain", which was a No. 8 hit in the UK in February 1994.

Early life and career
The daughter of a pastor, Moten began singing in a church choir as a child. She attended Overton High School in Memphis and sang in the Overton Choir under the direction of the late Lulah M. Hedgeman. She won a Mid-South Fair singing competition at age 16, and got a job singing at a theme park. She attended Memphis State University (now the University of Memphis) as a music business major at the Rudi E. Scheidt School of Music. She was discovered by promo man Dick Williams who heard her as she was singing on a jingle in a Memphis studio. She got her first break singing with Michael Bolton at a benefit concert; after signing with EMI, in 1992 she released her self-titled debut album and opened for Bolton on tour. Moten's biggest hit single was "Come In Out of the Rain", which, although only peaking at #55 in 1993 on the Billboard Hot 100, was a No. 5 adult contemporary hit, and also reached the Top 10 in the UK Singles Chart, where it peaked at No. 8 in 1994. A follow-up single, "So Close to Love" did not chart in the U.S. but reached No. 35 in the UK Top 40. She had s starring role in an off-Broadway production, "Mama I Want to Sing". In the late 1990s, with her personal career at a crossroads, she accepted an offer to tour with Julio Iglesias, a working relationship that continued for the next 15 years. She said, "I toured the whole world with him, singing in four languages . . . flying around in private jets and singing in front of massive audiencies."

In 2006, Moten sang back-up vocals on the Soul2Soul II Tour with Tim McGraw and Faith Hill. She continued touring with Tim and Faith from 2005-2018. She contributed backing vocals to Bonnie Tyler's 2013 album Rocks and Honey. She also toured with Martina McBride from 2014-2016 providing background vocals. Moten was a harmony singer for Vince Gill and was a member of his Time Jumpers for several years, but in 2020, Gill took her on tour as a featured vocalist. She competed in the twenty-first season of The Voice; she finished as the runner-up of the season.

Discography

 Wendy Moten (1992)
 Time for Change (1995)
 Life's What You Make It (1996)
 Tis the Season (2009)
 Timeless – Wendy Moten Sings Richard Whiting (2014)
 I've Got You Covered (2020)

References

External links 
The complete Wendy Moten Story with an interview in Soul Express

1965 births
Living people
20th-century African-American women singers
American women pop singers
American contemporary R&B singers
American soul singers
Singers from Tennessee
20th-century American women singers
21st-century American women singers
20th-century American singers
21st-century American singers
21st-century African-American women singers
The Voice (franchise) contestants